The Seyed Rasoul Hosseini Arena is an indoor sports arena in Sari, Iran.It is the home stadium of Futsal Super League team Shahrvand. The facility seats 5,000 people.

References

External links
 Mazandaran Sport

Indoor arenas in Iran
Sport in Sari, Iran